Qinglongqiao Subdistrict, is a subdistrict of Haidian District, Beijing. and is located immediately north of the Summer Palace. The subdistrict shares border with Malianwa and Shangdi Subdistricts in the north, Dongsheng Town and Qinghuayuan Subdistrict in the east, Wanliu Area and Sijiqing Town to the south, Xiangshan Subdistrict and Xibeiwang Town to the west. As of 2020, it had 84,221 people residing inside of its border.

The subdistrict was created in 1963. It was named after the Qinglongqiao, which was first built upon an artificial lake during the Yuan dynasty.

Administrative Divisions 
In the year 2021, the subdistrict consisted of 20 residential communities:

Gallery

See also
List of township-level divisions of Beijing

References 

Subdistricts of Beijing
Haidian District